"Bernadette" is a song by IAMX, taken as the second single from his studio album Volatile Times, and released on 28 July 2011. It is available as a digital download from iTunes and IAMX.eu.

Music videos
Two music videos were released for the single, one for the English version and another one for the German version. The videos were directed by Berlin-based duo A Nice Idea Every Day, and produced by Daniela Höller, using a wiggle stereoscopy method.

Tracklisting  (2011)
iTunes download

Tracklisting (2022 reissue) 
The Bernadette EP was reissued on 16 September 2022:
 "Bernadette (Radio Edit)"
 "Bernadette (ArtBleedsMoney Rework)"
 "Bernadette (Acoustic)"
 "Bernadette (Radio Edit Deutsch)"
 "Bernadette (Post Romanian Storm)"
 "Bernadette (Headfuck Collage)"
 "Bernadette (Instrumental)"

References

External links
"Bernadette" digital single

IAMX songs
2010 songs
2011 singles
Songs written by Chris Corner